Carlos Gattiker (6 June 1956 – 19 May 2010) was a professional tennis player from Argentina.

Career
Gattiker made four Grand Prix doubles semi-finals during his career, at Buenos Aires in 1977, Indianapolis in 1980, Kitzbuhel in 1981 and Bahia in 1983. His partner in Kitzbuhel was his brother Alejandro Gattiker.

He also partnered his brother at Grand Slam level. One of their three Grand Slam appearances together was at the 1980 Wimbledon Championships, where they lost a five-set match to another pair of brothers, John and Tony Lloyd. Gattiker played in five further Grand Slam tournaments, as either a singles of doubles player, but was never able to progress past the first round.

The Argentinian represented his country in a 1980 Davis Cup tie against the United States. He and Ricardo Cano took part in the doubles rubber, which they lost to Peter Fleming and John McEnroe.

Post-retirement
After retiring, Gattiker turned to coaching. Gattiker worked mostly with players from Argentina, including Pablo Albano and Luis Lobo, but also coached Morocco's Karim Alami. He died in 2010 of amyotrophic lateral sclerosis, which he had been suffering for 12 years.

Challenger titles

Singles: (1)

Doubles: (5)

References

1956 births
2010 deaths
Argentine male tennis players
Argentine tennis coaches
Tennis players from Buenos Aires
Neurological disease deaths in Argentina
Deaths from motor neuron disease